Lucius Domitius Alexander (died c. 310), also occasionally called Alexander II, was vicarius of Africa when Emperor Maxentius ordered him to send his son as hostage to Rome. Alexander refused and proclaimed himself emperor in 308.

Little of his early life is known, though he was probably born in Phrygia. The most detailed if somewhat confusing description of the insurrection is given by Zosimus (II, 12 and 14). He reports that Maxentius sent his portrait to Africa to gain recognition as Emperor there. The troops resisted because of their loyalty to Galerius. Maxentius ordered Domitius Alexander, the vicar of Africa, to send his son to Rome to secure his loyalty. Alexander refused and was crowned Emperor by his army. The incident was probably caused by the conflict between Maxentius and his father Maximian early in 308, and Zosimos confused Galerius with Maximian in his account.

Apart from the provinces in north Africa (today's Algeria, Tunisia and western Libya), Domitius Alexander also controlled Sardinia. At the time of his accession, he was already at an advanced age. There is evidence in an inscription (CIL viii, 22183) that Alexander and Constantine I allied themselves in opposition to Maxentius. Salama suggests that, at the latest, the pact was entered into by autumn of 310.

Maxentius sent his praetorian prefect Rufius Volusianus and a certain Zenas to quell the rebellion, and Alexander was taken prisoner and then executed by strangulation. Apparently, his troops did not offer much resistance. Maxentius retaliated with confiscations of the property of alleged supporters of Alexander. The year of the end of Alexander's reign is subject to debate; dates ranging from 309 to 311 have been proposed.

Notes

References 
Barnes, Timothy D., The New Empire of Diocletian and Constantine, Cambridge (Mass.) 1981, p. 14f.
Chastagnol, André, Les Fastes de la Préfecture de Rome au Bas-Empire, Paris 1962, p. 54ff.
Paschoud, Francois (ed.), Zosime: Histoire Nouvelle, Paris 2000, p. 213ff.
 Ferdinando Angeletti, L’insurrezione di Lucio Domizio Alessandro (308 – 310 d.C.). – Storia della prima insurrezione d’Africa in Storiadelmondo N. 75 – Roma 2014

External links 

De imperatoribus Romanis on Alexander, including bibliography.

3rd-century births
311 deaths
4th-century Roman usurpers
4th-century murdered monarchs
Executed Roman emperors
People executed by strangulation
4th-century executions
People executed by the Roman Empire
Alexander
Tetrarchy